Pebble is a ghost town in Dodge County, Nebraska, United States.

History
Pebble was platted in 1870, but the town later fell into terminal decline when the railroad bypassed it.

References

Geography of Dodge County, Nebraska